The Nueva Ecija University of Science and Technology (NEUST), is a state university located in the province of Nueva Ecija, Central Luzon, Philippines, with its flagship campus at Cabanatuan. The university offers graduate and undergraduate courses in many specialized fields as well as vocational training programs.

The university was established in 1908 and celebrated its centennial year in 2008.

History
The Nueva Ecija University of Science and Technology started as a vocational course at the Wright Institute in San Isidro, Nueva Ecija where young Filipinos were trained in woodworking and basic telegraphy, the said vocational course lasted until 1927 when the general secondary education course was transferred to Cabanatuan.

On June 9, 1929, the school was renamed the Nueva Ecija Trade School (NETS) in accordance with Vocational Education Act 3377 of 1929. The NETS was based in San Isidro, Nueva Ecija, offering vocational opportunities to the youth of the province. The first and only vocational course being offered then was woodworking. That course was an addition to the existing secondary curriculum inherited from the Wright Institute.

To meet with the increasing demand for vocational education in province, on June 7, 1931, the trade school was transferred to Cabanatuan. The program was interrupted in December 1941 by the outbreak of the Second World War in the Pacific.

After the war, the trade school immediately reopened on September 6, 1945, and rehabilitation programs took place. The trade school continued to provide vocational and manpower training for students from Nueva Ecija and nearby provinces. On June 8, 1948, a course in dressmaking was opened and for the first time female students were admitted in the school. A few years later, a food and cosmetology course was also offered.

On May 28, 1953, the NETS was converted into the Central Luzon School of Arts and Trades (CLSAT) by the virtue of Republic Act No. 845. CLSAT was recognized as a center of manpower and vocational training for both the youth and the adults not only in the province but also for the entire Central Luzon region. CLSAT was converted into the Central Luzon Polytechnic College (CLPC) by virtue of Republic Act. No. 3998 signed on June 18, 1964, by then President Diosdado Macapagal.

Thirty-four years later, under the leadership of then University President Gemiliano C. Calling, the Bill converting CLPC into NEUST was signed by House Speaker Jose de Venecia on February 19, 1998, and was forwarded to President Fidel V. Ramos on February 24, 1998. The bill lapsed into Law on March 27, 1998, as Republic Act. No. 8612, converting CLPC into a specialized university, the Nueva Ecija University of Science and Technology.

Campuses

As of December 2020, NEUST has six campuses and six academic extended venues (formerly referred to as academic extension campuses) in different areas of Nueva Ecija:

Campuses
 Sumacab Main Campus
 General Tinio Street Campus
 Atate Campus
 Fort Magsaysay Campus
 Gabaldon Campus
 San Isidro Campus

Academic extended venues
 Carranglan Academic Extended Venue, 
 Peñaranda Academic Extended Venue
 General Tinio Papaya Academic Extended Venue
 San Antonio Academic Extended Venue
 San Leonardo Academic Extended Venue
 Talavera Academic Extended Venue

The university also maintains a Cyber Campus to assist distance learning students.

Former campus

Gapan Academic Extension Campus (GAEC)
Gapan had an academic extension campus which was part of the South Academic Extension Campuses of the university. It was established by former Gapan mayor Ernesto L. Natividad and the NEUST administration in 2007. GAEC was initially located within the compound of Juan R. Liwag Memorial High School. GAEC now operates as the Gapan City College.

Graduate courses

Gen. Tinio Street Campus, Cabanatuan 

Graduate School
Doctor of Education
Industrial Technology Education
Doctor of Philosophy Major in
 Science Education
Mathematics Education
Engineering Management
Educational Management
Business Administration
Public Administration
Master of Arts in English
Master of Arts in Industrial Education
Master of Arts In Teaching Major in
Science
Physics
Mathematics
Master of Arts in Vocational – Technological Education
Master of Business Administration
Master of Education Management
Master of Engineering Management
Master of Public Administration
Master of Science in Agriculture

Undergraduate courses

Sumacab Main Campus

College of Architecture
Bachelor of Science in Architecture
College of Criminology
Bachelor of Science in Criminology
College of Education
Bachelor of Elementary Education
Bachelor of Physical Education
Bachelor of Secondary Education
Bachelor of Technology and Livelihood Education
Bachelor of Science in Industrial Education
College of Engineering
Bachelor of Science in Civil Engineering
Bachelor of Science in Electrical Engineering
Bachelor of Science in Mechanical Engineering
College of Information and Communications Technology
Bachelor of Science in Information Technology
College of Management and Business Technology
Bachelor of Science in Business Administration
Bachelor of Science in Entrepreneurship
Bachelor of Science in Hospitality Management
Bachelor of Science in Hotel and Restaurant Management
Bachelor of Science in Tourism Management

Gen. Tinio Street Campus

College of Arts and Sciences
Bachelor of Science in Biology
Bachelor of Science in Food Technology
Bachelor of Science in Psychology
Bachelor of Science in Chemistry
Bachelor of Science in Environmental Science
College of Education
Laboratory High School
Junior High School
Senior High School
College of Industrial Technology
Accelerated Vocational Training Program
 AM/FM Radio Servicing
 Auto-CAD
 Auto Electricity
 Auto Engine
 Baking
 Computer Application Package
 Culinary Arts
 Drafting
 Garments (Dress Making)
 Industrial Motor Control
 Industrial Wiring
 Machine Shop
 Motor Rewinding
 Pneumatic and Electro-pneumatic Control
 Programmable Logic Controller
 TV/Video Servicing
 Welding
Bachelor of Industrial Technology
Electronics and Communication Engineering Technology
College of Nursing
Bachelor of Science in Nursing
College of Public Administration and Disaster Management
Bachelor of Public Administration

Other campuses 

Gabaldon Campus
Bachelor of Science in Agriculture
Bachelor of Elementary Education
Bachelor of Secondary Education
Bachelor of Science in Information Technology
Bachelor of Science in Business Administration
Bachelor of Science in Hospitality Management

Atate Campus
Bachelor of Science in Information Technology
Bachelor of Science in Business Administration
Bachelor of Science in Entrepreneurship
Bachelor of Science in Hospitality Management
Bachelor of Science in Hotel and Restaurant Management

Fort Magsaysay Campus
Bachelor of Science in Business Administration

San Isidro Campus
Bachelor of Elementary Education
Bachelor of Physical Education
Bachelor of Secondary Education
Bachelor of Science in Industrial Education
Bachelor of Science in Information Technology
Bachelor of Science in Business Administration
Bachelor of Science in Entrepreneurship

Academic Extension Venues

Carranglan Academic Extension Venue
Bachelor of Elementary Education
Bachelor of Science in Information Technology
Bachelor of Science in Business Administration
Bachelor of Science in Entrepreneurship

General Tinio Papaya Academic Extension Venue
Bachelor of Elementary Education
Bachelor of Physical Education
Bachelor of Secondary Education
Bachelor of Science in Information Technology
Bachelor of Science in Business Administration

Peñaranda Academic Extension Venue
Bachelor of Elementary Education
Bachelor of Secondary Education
Bachelor of Science in Information Technology
Bachelor of Science in Business Administration

San Antonio Academic Extension Venue
Bachelor of Elementary Education
Bachelor of Science in Information Technology
Bachelor of Science in Business Administration

San Leonardo Academic Extension Venue
Bachelor of Elementary Education
Bachelor of Secondary Education
Bachelor of Science in Information Technology
Bachelor of Science in Business Administration
Bachelor of Science in Hospitality Management

Talavera Academic Extension Venue
Bachelor of Elementary Education
Bachelor of Science in Information Technology
Bachelor of Science in Business Administration

Notable alumni
 Jason Abalos - Actor

References

External links
 Official website
 NEUST Cyber Campus

Universities and colleges in Nueva Ecija
State universities and colleges in the Philippines
Education in Cabanatuan
Educational institutions established in 1908
1908 establishments in the Philippines